Korg MS-10 is an analogue synthesizer created by Korg in 1978. Unlike its bigger brother, the Korg MS-20, the MS-10 only has one VCO, one VCF and one envelope generator. It is monophonic and has 32 keys.

The MS-10 is well known for its huge sounding electro bass sounds.

Architecture

Audio path

Oscillator
The MS-10 has one VCO with 4 waveforms: triangle, sawtooth, pulse, and white noise.

Filter
The MS-10 has the same "KORG35" 12 dB/Oct low pass filter as the original MS-20.  Resonance ("peak" in Korg parlance) is adjustable but not voltage-controlled.

Originally, the filters used Korg's proprietary KORG-35 thick film IC. Later, the filters were redesigned to use off-the-shelf LM13600 OTAs.

A useful illustration of the Korg-35 filter in-circuit is shown here  and some photographs illustrating the later LM13600 filter daughterboard are shown  here. The tonal difference between the two is that the original Korg-35 filter has a slight amount of hiss which overdrives into the sound at high resonant settings. This causes the filter to have more of a "screaming" effect similar to it being used with a distortion pedal. The revised filter has most of this noise cleared up and is less aggressive sounding.

Output
There is a simple single transistor VCA. The amplitude of the VCA can be controlled by the envelope generator.

Modulation

Modulation generator
The MS-10 has one LFO, labelled "modulation generator". It has two controls (rate and shape) and two outputs (pulse and sloped).

The shape control affects the pulse width and the shape of the sloped output. At midway, the pulse width is 50% and the output is a triangle wave. Both outputs are available through the patch panel and can be used for triggering the envelope generators – the pulse wave with a key held down, and the sloped without. The depth of LFO modulation of the VCO frequency and the filter cut-off can be controlled from knobs in the respective sections of the control panel.

Envelope
There is one envelope generator with controls for Hold, Attack, Decay, Sustain and Release.

Patching
Although the MS-10 has normalized connections, they can be modified with patch cables. This allows the LFO to modulate the pulse width (which is called pulse-width modulation, or PWM) of the VCO or the amplitude of the VCA. It also has a noise generator with white and pink noise outputs, CV in and out, and an external signal input (not to be confused with the "External Signal Processor" of the MS-20).

Compatibility with other synths and modules
The MS-10's VCO uses linear voltage control (Hz/Volt) but note that V/oct scaling (−5V to +5V) is available via judicious use of the "freq" CV input socket. A CV converter can also be used.

Notable users
 Abstract Lion
 Add N to (X)
 Astral Projection
 Autechre
 Chemical Brothers
 Juan Atkins
 Junoto
 Junkie XL
 Luke Vibert
 Nitro Pulse
 The Orb
 Paul Evolution
 Puce Mary
 SkyLab
 Sneaker Pimps
 Towa Tei
 Underworld

References

MS-10
Analog synthesizers
Monophonic synthesizers